Paracuneus kemblensis is a species of sea snail, a marine gastropod mollusk in the family Drilliidae.

The epithet "kemblensis" is derived from Port Kembla, New South Wales, where the species was first found.

Description

Distribution
This marine species is endemic to Australia and occurs in the demersal zone off New South Wales.

References

  Tucker, J.K. 2004 Catalog of recent and fossil turrids (Mollusca: Gastropoda). Zootaxa 682:1–1295

External links

kemblensis
Gastropods described in 1954